Amin Sabir oğlu Seydiyev (born 15 November 1998) is an Azerbaijani professional footballer who plays as a defenderfor Sabah in the Azerbaijan Premier League.

Career

Club
On 3 February 2019, Seydiyev made his debut in the Azerbaijan Premier League for Gabala match against Sumgayit.

On 21 May 2020, Seydiyev signed a three-year contract with Sabah FK.

Honours
Gabala
Azerbaijan Cup (1): 2018–19

References

External links
 

1998 births
Living people
Association football defenders
Azerbaijani footballers
Azerbaijan international footballers
Azerbaijan under-21 international footballers
Azerbaijan youth international footballers
Azerbaijan Premier League players
Gabala FC players
Sabah FC (Azerbaijan) players